Fort McAllister State Park is a  Georgia state park located near Keller and Richmond Hill in south Bryan County, Georgia and on the south bank of the Ogeechee River (some parts of the park border the Atlantic Ocean). It is roughly ten miles south of Savannah. The park is home to Fort McAllister, the best-preserved earthwork fortification of the Confederacy. Though the earthworks were attacked unsuccessfully seven times by Union soldiers, it did not fall until it was taken by General Sherman in 1864 during his March to the Sea. The park, located on the coast, is nestled among giant live oaks and a large salt marsh. In addition, the park contains a museum specializing in Civil War artifacts. The fort was added to the National Register of Historic Places in 1970.

Facilities
56 tent/trailer/RV Campsites
2 Backcountry Campsites
7 Cottages
2 Picnic Shelters
2 Pioneer Campgrounds
1 Group Shelter
Boat ramps
Dock
Fishing pier
Civil War museum
Playground

Annual events
4th of July Barbecue, Picnic and Craft Show (July)
Fort tours
Labor Day and Winter Musters
Super Sundays

Photos

See also
Battle of Fort McAllister (1863)
Battle of Fort McAllister (1864)
Battle of Fort Pulaski
National Register of Historic Places in Bryan County, Georgia

References

External links
 
Fort McAllister Historic Park

1970 establishments in Georgia (U.S. state)
American Civil War battlefields
American Civil War museums in Georgia (U.S. state)
Georgia (U.S. state) in the American Civil War
Military and war museums in Georgia (U.S. state)
Museums in Bryan County, Georgia
Protected areas established in 1970
Protected areas of Bryan County, Georgia
State parks of Georgia (U.S. state)